Hun River may refer to:

 Hun River (Liao River tributary) in northeastern China
 Hun River (Yalu River tributary) in northeastern China
 River Hun, a stream in Norfolk, England